British foreign policy in the Middle East has involved multiple considerations, particularly over the last two and a half centuries. These included  maintaining access to British India, blocking Russian or French threats to that access, protecting the Suez Canal, supporting the declining Ottoman Empire against Russian threats, guaranteeing an oil supply after 1900 from Middle East fields, protecting Egypt and other possessions in the Middle East, and enforcing Britain's naval role in the Mediterranean. The timeframe of major concern stretches from the 1770s when the Russian Empire began to dominate the Black Sea, down to the Suez Crisis of the mid-20th century and involvement in the Iraq War in the early 21st. These policies are an integral part of the history of the foreign relations of the United Kingdom.

Napoleon's threat

Napoleon, the leader of the French wars against Britain from the late 1790s until 1815, used the French fleet to convey a large invasion army to Egypt, a major remote province of the Ottoman Empire. British commercial interests represented by the Levant Company had a successful base in Egypt, and indeed the company handled all Egypt's diplomacy. The British responded and sank the French fleet at the Battle of the Nile in 1798, thereby trapping Napoleon's army. Napoleon escaped. The Army he left behind was defeated by the British and the survivors returned to France in 1801. In 1807 when Britain was at war with the Ottomans, the British sent a force to Alexandria, but it was defeated by the Egyptians under Mohammed Ali and withdrew.  Britain absorbed the Levant company into the Foreign Office by 1825.

Greek independence: 1821–1833

Europe was generally peaceful; the Greek's long war of independence was the major military conflict in the 1820s. Serbia had gained its autonomy from Ottoman Empire in 1815. The Greek rebellion came next starting in 1821, with a rebellion indirectly sponsored by Russia. The Greeks had strong intellectual and business communities which employed propaganda echoing the French Revolution that appealed to the romanticism of Western Europe. Despite harsh Ottoman reprisals they kept their rebellion alive. Sympathizers like British poet Lord Byron played a major role in shaping British opinion to strongly favor the Greeks, especially among Philosophical Radicals, the Whigs, and the Evangelicals.  However the top British foreign policy makers George Canning (1770–1827) and Viscount Castlereagh (1769–1822) were much more cautious. They agreed that the Ottoman Empire was "barbarous" but they decided it was a necessary evil. British policy down to 1914 was to preserve the Ottoman Empire, especially against hostile pressures from Russia. However, when Ottoman behavior was outrageously oppressive against Christians, London demanded reforms and concessions.

The context of the three Great Powers' intervention was Russia's long-running expansion at the expense of the decaying Ottoman Empire. However Russia's ambitions in the region were seen as a major geostrategic threat by the other European powers. Austria feared the disintegration of the Ottoman Empire would destabilize its southern borders. Russia gave strong emotional support for the fellow Orthodox Christian Greeks. The British were motivated by strong public support for the Greeks. The government in London paid special attention to the powerful role of the Royal Navy throughout the entire Mediterranean region. Fearing unilateral Russian action in support of the Greeks, Britain and France bound Russia by treaty to a joint intervention which aimed to secure Greek autonomy whilst preserving Ottoman territorial integrity as a check on Russia.

The Powers agreed, by the Treaty of London (1827), to force the Ottoman government to grant the Greeks autonomy within the empire and despatched naval squadrons to Greece to enforce their policy. The decisive Allied naval victory at the Battle of Navarino broke the military power of the Ottomans and their Egyptian allies. Victory saved the fledgling Greek Republic from collapse. But it required two more military interventions, by Russia in the form of the Russo-Turkish War of 1828–29 and by a French expeditionary force to the Peloponnese to force the withdrawal of Ottoman forces from central and southern Greece and to finally secure Greek independence.  Greek nationalists proclaimed a new "Great Idea" whereby the little nation of 800,000 would expand to include all the millions of Greek Orthodox believers in the region now under Ottoman control, with Constantinople to be reclaimed as its capital. This idea was the antithesis of the British goal of maintaining the Ottoman Empire, and London systematically opposed the Greeks until the Great Idea finally collapsed in 1922 when Turkey drove the Greeks out of Anatolia.

Crimean War

The Crimean War 1853 to 1856 was a major conflict fought in the Crimean Peninsula. The Russian Empire lost to an alliance made up of Britain, France, and the Ottoman Empire. The immediate causes of the war were minor.  The longer-term causes involved the decline of the Ottoman Empire and Russia's misunderstanding of the British position. Tsar Nicholas I visited London in person and consulted with Foreign Secretary Lord Aberdeen regarding What would happen if the Ottoman Empire collapsed and had to be split up. The Tsar completely misread the British position as one of supporting Russian aggression. In fact, London stood with Paris in opposition to any breakup of the Ottoman Empire, and especially against any Russian aggrandizement. When Aberdeen became Prime Minister in 1852, the tsar mistakenly assumed he had British approval for aggressive moves against Turkey.  He was astonished when the British declared war. Aberdeen had opposed the war, but public opinion demanded war and he was forced out. The new prime minister was Lord Palmerston who strongly opposed Russia. He defined the popular imagination which saw the war against Russia is a commitment to British principles, notably the defense of liberty, civilization, free trade; and championing the underdog. The fighting was largely limited to actions in the Crimean Peninsula and the Black Sea. Both sides badly mishandled operations; the world was aghast at the extremely high death rates due to disease. In the end, the British-French coalition prevailed and Russia lost control of the Black Sea-- although it managed to recover that in 1871. 

Pompous aristocracy was a loser in the war, the winners were the ideals of middle-class efficiency, progress, and peaceful reconciliation. The war's great hero was Florence Nightingale, the nurse who brought scientific management and expertise to heal the horrible sufferings of the tens of thousands of sick and dying British soldiers.  according to historian R. B. McCallum the Crimean war:
 remained as a classic example, a perfect demonstration-peace, of how governments may plunge into war, how strong ambassadors may mislead weak prime ministers, how the public may be worked up into a facile fury, and how the achievements of the war may crumble to nothing. The Bright-Cobden criticism of the war was remembered and to a large extent accepted. Isolation from European entanglements seemed more than ever desirable.

Seizure of Egypt, 1882
As owners of the Suez Canal, both British and French governments had strong interests in the stability of Egypt. Most of the traffic was by British merchant ships. However in 1881 the ʻUrabi revolt broke out-- it was a nationalist movement led by Ahmed ʻUrabi (1841–1911) against the administration of Khedive Tewfik, who collaborated closely with the British and French. Combined with the complete turmoil in Egyptian finances, the threat to the Suez Canal, and  embarrassment to British prestige if it could not handle a revolt, London found the situation intolerable and decided to end it by force. The French, however, did not join in. On 11 July 1882, Prime Minister William E. Gladstone ordered the bombardment of Alexandria which launched the short decisive Anglo-Egyptian War of 1882. Egypt nominally remained under the sovereignty of the Ottoman Empire, and France and other nations had representation, but British officials made the decisions. The Khedive (Viceroy) was the Ottoman official in Cairo, appointed by the Sultan in Constantinople. He appointed the Council of ministers and high-ranking military officer; he controlled the treasury and sign treaties. In practice he operated under the close supervision of the British consul general. The dominant personality was Consul-general Evelyn Baring, 1st Earl of Cromer (1841–1917). He was thoroughly familiar with the British Raj in India, and applied similar policies to take full control of the Egyptian economy. London repeatedly promised to depart in a few years. It did so 66 times until 1914, when it gave up the pretense and assumed permanent control.

Historian A.J.P. Taylor says that the seizure of Egypt "was a great event; indeed, the only real event in international relations between the Battle of Sedan and the defeat of Russia in the Russo-Japanese war."
Taylor emphasizes long-term impact:

Gladstone and the Liberals had a reputation for strong opposition to imperialism, so historians have long debated the explanation for this reversal of policy. The most influential was a study by John Robinson and Ronald Gallagher, Africa and the Victorians (1961). They focused on The Imperialism of Free Trade and promoted the highly influential Cambridge School of historiography. They argue there was no long-term Liberal plan in support of imperialism. Instead they saw the urgent necessity to act to protect the Suez Canal in the face of what appeared to be a radical collapse of law and order, and a nationalist revolt focused on expelling the Europeans, regardless of the damage it would do to international trade and the British Empire. Gladstone's decision came against strained relations with France, and maneuvering by "men on the spot" in Egypt. Critics such as Cain and Hopkins have stressed the need to protect large sums invested by British financiers and Egyptian bonds, while downplaying the risk to the viability of the Suez Canal. Unlike the Marxists, they stress "gentlemanly" financial and commercial interests, not the industrial capitalism that Marxists believe was always central.

A.G. Hopkins rejected Robinson and Gallagher's argument, citing original documents to claim that there was no perceived danger to the Suez Canal from the ‘Urabi movement, and that ‘Urabi and his forces were not chaotic "anarchists", but rather maintained law and order.  He alternatively argues that Gladstone's cabinet was motivated by protecting the interests of British bondholders with investments in Egypt as well as by pursuit of domestic political popularity. Hopkins cites the British investments in Egypt that grew massively leading into the 1880s, partially as a result of the Khedive's debt from construction of the Suez Canal, as well as the close links that existed between the British government and the economic sector. He writes that Britain's economic interests occurred simultaneously with a desire within one element of the ruling Liberal Party for a militant foreign policy in order to gain the domestic political popularity that enabled it to compete with the Conservative Party. Hopkins cites a letter from Edward Malet, the British consul general in Egypt at the time, to a member of the Gladstone Cabinet offering his congratulations on the invasion: "You have fought the battle of all Christendom and history will acknowledge it. May I also venture to say that it has given the Liberal Party a new lease of popularity and power."  However, Dan Halvorson argues that the protection of the Suez Canal and British financial and trade interests were secondary and derivative. Instead, the primary motivation was the vindication of British prestige in both Europe and especially in India by suppressing the threat to “civilised” order posed by the Urabist revolt.

Armenia
The Ottoman Empire leadership had long been hostile to its Armenian element, and in World War I accused it of favouring Russia.  The result was an attempt to relocate Armenians in which hundreds of thousands died in the Armenian genocide#British forces in the Middle East.  Since the late 1870s Gladstone had moved Britain into playing a leading role in denouncing the harsh policies and atrocities and mobilizing world opinion. In 1878-1883 Germany followed the lead of Britain in adopting an Eastern policy that demanded reforms in the Ottoman policies that would ameliorate the position of the Armenian minority.

Persian Gulf

In 1650, British diplomats signed  a treaty  with the Sultan at Oman declaring that the bond  between the two nations should be "unshook to the end of time."   British policy was to expand its presence in the Persian Gulf region, with a strong base in Oman. Two London-based companies were used, first the Levant Company and later the East India Company. The shock of Napoleon's 1798 expedition to Egypt led London to significantly strengthen its ties in the Arab states of the Persian Gulf, pushing out the French and Dutch rivals, and upgrading the East India Company operations to diplomatic status. The East India Company also expanded relations with other sultanates in the region, and expanded operations into southern Persia. There was something of a standoff with Russian interests, which were active in northern Persia. The commercial agreements allowed for British control of mineral resources, but the first oil was discovered in the region in Persia in 1908. The Anglo-Persian Oil Company activated the concession and quickly became the Royal Navy's main source of fuel for the new diesel engines that were replacing coal-burning steam engines. The company merged into BP (British Petroleum). The main advantage of oil was that a warship could easily carry fuel for long voyages without having to make repeated stops at coaling stations.

Aden

When Napoleon threatened Egypt in 1798, one of his threats was to cut off British access to India. In response the East India Company (EIC) negotiated an agreement with Aden’s sultan  that  provided rights to the deepwater harbor on Arabia's southern coast including a strategically important coaling station. The EIC took full control in 1839.  With the opening of the Suez Canal in 1869, Aden  took a much greater strategic an economic importance. To protect against threats from the Ottoman Empire, the EIC negotiated agreements with sheikhs in the hinterland, and by 1900 had absorbed their territory. Local demands for independence led in 1937 to designation of Aden  as a Crown Colony separate from India. Nearby areas were consolidated as the  Western Aden protectorate and Eastern Aden protectorate. Some 1300 sheikhs and chieftains signed agreements and remained in power locally. They resisted demands from leftist labor unions based in the ports and refineries, and strongly opposed the threat of Yemen to incorporate them. London considered the military base and Aiden as essential to protect its oil interest in the Persian Gulf. Expenses mounted, budgets were cut, and London misinterpreted the mounting internal conflicts.   In 1963 the Federation of South Arabia was set up that merged the colony and 15 of the protectorates. Independence was announced, leading to the Aden Emergency--a civil war involving Soviet-backed National Liberation Front   fighting the Egyptian-backed Front for the Liberation of Occupied South Yemen. In 1967 the Labour government under Harold Wilson withdrew its forces from Aden.  The National Liberation Front quickly took power and announced the creation of a communist People’s Republic of South Yemen, deposing the traditional leaders in the sheikhdoms and sultanates. It was merged with Yemen into People's Democratic Republic of Yemen, with close ties to Moscow.

World War I

The Ottoman Empire entered World War I on the side of Germany and immediately became an enemy of Britain and France.  Four major  Allied operations attacked the Ottoman holdings. The Gallipoli Campaign to control the Straits failed in 1915-1916. The first Mesopotamian campaign invading Iraq from India also failed.  The second one captured Baghdad in 1917. The Sinai and Palestine campaign from Egypt was a British success. By 1918 the Ottoman Empire was a military failure/ It signed an armistice in late October that amounted to surrender.

Postwar planning
In the 1920s, British policymakers  debated two alternative approaches to Middle Eastern issues. Many diplomats adopted the line of thought of T. E. Lawrence favoring Arab national ideals. The back the Hashemite family for top leadership positions. The other approach led by Arnold Wilson, the civil commissioner for Iraq, reflected the views of the India office. They argue that direct British rule was essential, and the Hashemite family was too supportive of policies  that would interfere with British interests. The decision was to support Arab nationalism, sidetracked Wilson, and consolidate power in the Colonial Office.

Iraq
The British seized Baghdad in March 1917. In 1918 it was joined to Mosul and Basra in the new nation of Iraq using a League of Nations Mandate. Experts from India designed the new system, which favoured direct rule by British appointees, and demonstrated distrust of the aptitude of local Arabs for self-government. The old Ottoman laws were discarded and replaced by new codes for civil and criminal law, based on Indian practice. The Indian rupee became the currency.  The army and police were staffed with Indians who had proven their loyalty to the British Raj. The large-scale Iraqi revolt of 1920 was crushed in the summer of 1920 but it was a major stimulus for Arab nationalism.  The Turkish Petroleum Company was given a monopoly on exploration and production in 1925.  Important oil reserves were First discovered in 1927; the name was changed to the Iraq Petroleum Company (IPC) in 1929. It was owned by a consortium of British, French, Dutch and American oil companies, and operated by the British until it was nationalized in 1972. The British ruled under the League mandate from 1918 to  1933.  Formal independence was granted in 1933, but with a very powerful British presence in the background.

World War II

Iraq 

The Anglo–Iraqi War (2–31 May 1941) was a British military campaign to regain control of Iraq and its major oil fields. Rashid Ali had seized power in 1941 with assistance from  Germany. The campaign resulted in the downfall of Ali's government, the re-occupation of Iraq by the British, and the return to power of the Regent of Iraq, Prince 'Abd al-Ilah, a British ally. The British launched a large pro-democracy propaganda campaign in Iraq from 1941–5. It promoted the Brotherhood of Freedom to instil civic pride in disaffected Iraqi youth. The rhetoric demanded internal political reform and warned against growing communist influence. Heavy use was made of the Churchill-Roosevelt Atlantic Charter. However, leftist groups adapted the same rhetoric to demand British withdrawal. Pro-Nazi propaganda was suppressed. The heated combination of democracy propaganda, Iraqi reform movements, and growing demands for British withdrawal and political reform became as a catalyst for postwar political change.

In 1955, the United Kingdom was part of the Baghdad Pact with Iraq. King Faisal II of Iraq paid a state visit to Britain in July 1956.  The British had a plan to use 'modernisation' and economic growth to solve Iraq's endemic problems of social and political unrest. The idea was that increased wealth through Oil production would ultimately trickle down to all elements and thereby thus stave off the danger of revolution. The oil was produced but the wealth never reached below the elite. Iraq's political-economic system put unscrupulous politicians and wealthy landowners at the apex of power. The remained in control using an all-permeating patronage system. As a consequence very little of the vast wealth was dispersed to the people, and unrest continue to grow.  In 1958, monarch and politicians were swept away in a vicious nationalist army revolt.

Suez Crisis of 1956

The Suez Crisis of 1956 was a major disaster for British (and French) foreign policy and left Britain a minor player in the Middle East because of very strong opposition from the United States.  The key move was an invasion of Egypt in late 1956 first by Israel, then by Britain and France. The aims were to regain Western control of the Suez Canal and to remove Egyptian president Gamal Abdel Nasser, who had just nationalised the canal. After the fighting had started, intense political pressure and economic threats from the United States, plus criticism from the Soviet Union and the United Nations forced a withdrawal by the three invaders. The episode humiliated the United Kingdom and France and strengthened Nasser.  The Egyptian forces were defeated, but they did block the canal to all shipping. The three allies had attained a number of their military objectives, but the canal was useless.  U.S. president Dwight D. Eisenhower had strongly warned Britain not to invade; he threatened serious damage to the British financial system by selling the US government's pound sterling bonds. The Suez Canal was closed from October 1956 until March 1957, causing great expense to British shipping interests. Historians conclude the crisis "signified the end of Great Britain's role as one of the world's major powers".

East of Suez

After 1956, the well-used rhetoric of the British role East of Suez was less and less meaningful. The independence of India, Malaya, Burma and other smaller possessions meant London had little role, and few military or economic assets to back it up. Hong Kong was growing in importance but it did not need military force. Labour was in power but both parties agreed on the need to cut the defence budget and redirect attention to Europe and NATO, so the forces were cut east of Suez.

See also
 History of the Middle East
 Russia–United Kingdom relations
 The Great Game
 Egypt–United Kingdom relations
 France–United Kingdom relations
 Iran–United Kingdom relations
 Iraq–United Kingdom relations
 Israel–United Kingdom relations
 Foreign relations of the Ottoman Empire
 Turkey–United Kingdom relations
 International relations, 1648–1814
 International relations of the Great Powers (1814–1919)
 Diplomatic history of World War I
 International relations (1919–1939)
 Diplomatic history of World War II
 Cold War
 Military history of the United Kingdom
 United States foreign policy in the Middle East

Notes

Further reading
 Agoston, Gabor, and Bruce Masters. Encyclopedia of the Ottoman Empire  (2008)
 Anderson, M.S. The Eastern Question, 1774-1923: A Study in International Relations (1966) online, the major scholarly study.
 Barr, James. "A Line in the Sand: British-French Rivalry in the Middle East 1915–1948." Asian Affairs 43.2 (2012): 237–252.
 Brenchley, Frank.   Britain and the Middle East: Economic History, 1945-87 (1991).
 Bullard, Reader. Britain and the Middle East from Earliest Times to 1963 (3rd ed. 1963)
 Cleveland, William L., and Martin Bunton. A History Of The Modern Middle East (6th ed. 2018 4th ed. online
 Corbett, Julian Stafford. England in the Mediterranean; a study of the rise and influence of British power within the Straits, 1603-1713 (1904) online
 D'Angelo, Michela. "In the 'English' Mediterranean (1511–1815)." Journal of Mediterranean Studies 12.2 (2002): 271–285.
 Deringil, Selim. "The Ottoman Response to the Egyptian Crisis of 1881-82" Middle Eastern Studies (1988) 24#1 pp. 3-24 online
 Dietz, Peter. The British in the Mediterranean (Potomac Books Inc, 1994).
 Fieldhouse, D. K. Western Imperialism in the Middle East 1914-1958 (Oxford UP, 2006)
 Harrison, Robert. Britain in the Middle East: 1619-1971 (2016)  short scholarly narrative  excerpt  
 Hattendorf, John B., ed. Naval Strategy and Power in the Mediterranean: Past, Present and Future (Routledge, 2013).
 Holland, Robert. "Cyprus and Malta: two colonial experiences." Journal of Mediterranean Studies 23.1 (2014): 9–20.
 Holland, Robert. Blue-water empire: the British in the Mediterranean since 1800 (Penguin UK, 2012). excerpt
 Laqueur, Walter. The Struggle for the Middle East: The Soviet Union and the Middle East 1958-70 (1972) online
 Louis, William  Roger. The British Empire in the Middle East, 1945–1951: Arab Nationalism, the United States, and Postwar Imperialism (1984)
 MacArthur-Seal, Daniel-Joseph. "Turkey and Britain: from enemies to allies, 1914–1939." Middle Eastern Studies (2018): 737-743.
 Mahajan, Sneh. British Foreign Policy 1874-1914: The Role of India (2002).
 Anderson, M.S. The Eastern Question, 1774-1923: A Study in International Relations (1966) online, the major scholarly study.
 Marriott, J. A. R. The Eastern Question An Historical Study In European Diplomacy (1940), Older comprehensive study; more up-to-date is Anderson (1966) Online
 Millman, Richard. Britain and the Eastern Question, 1875–1878 (1979)
 Monroe, Elizabeth. Britain's moment in the Middle East, 1914-1956 (1964) online
 Olson, James E. and Robert Shadle, eds., Historical dictionary of the British Empire (1996)
 Owen, Roger. Lord Cromer: Victorian Imperialist, Edwardian Proconsul (Oxford UP, 2005) Online review, On Egypt 1882-1907.
 Pack, S.W.C Sea Power in the Mediterranean – has a complete list of fleet commanders
 Panton, Kenneth J. Historical Dictionary of the British Empire (2015).
 Schumacher, Leslie Rogne. "A 'Lasting Solution': the Eastern Question and British Imperialism, 1875-1878." (2012). online; Detailed bibliography
 Seton-Watson, R. W. Disraeli, Gladstone, and the Eastern question; a study in diplomacy and party politics (1972) Online
 Seton-Watson, R. W.  Britain in Europe 1789-1914, a Survey of Foreign Policy (1937) Online
 Smith, Simon C.  Ending Empire in the Middle East: Britain, the United States and Post-war Decolonization, 1945-1973 (2012).
 Smith, Simon C. Britain's Revival and Fall in the Gulf: Kuwait, Bahrain, Qatar, and the Trucial States, 1950-71 (2004)
 Smith, Simon C. Britain and the Arab Gulf after Empire: Kuwait, Bahrain, Qatar, and the United Arab Emirates, 1971-1981 (Routledge, 2019).
 Syrett, David. "A Study of Peacetime Operations: The Royal Navy in the Mediterranean, 1752–5." The Mariner's Mirror 90.1 (2004): 42-50.
 Talbot, Michael. British-Ottoman Relations, 1661-1807: Commerce and Diplomatic Practice in Eighteenth-Century Istanbul (Boydell & Brewer, 2017).
 Thomas, Martin, and Richard Toye. "Arguing about intervention: a comparison of British and French rhetoric surrounding the 1882 and 1956 invasions of Egypt." Historical Journal 58.4 (2015): 1081-1113 online.
 Tuchman, Barbara W. Bible and Sword: England and Palestine from the Bronze Age to Balfour (1982), popular history of Britain in the Middle East; online
 Uyar, Mesut, and Edward J. Erickson. A Military History of the Ottomans: From Osman to Atatürk (ABC-CLIO, 2009).
 Venn, Fiona. "The wartime ‘special relationship’? From oil war to Anglo-American Oil Agreement, 1939–1945." Journal of Transatlantic Studies 10.2 (2012): 119-133.
 Williams, Kenneth.  Britain And The Mediterranean (1940) online free
 Yenen, Alp. "Elusive forces in illusive eyes: British officialdom's perception of the Anatolian resistance movement." Middle Eastern Studies 54.5 (2018): 788-810. online
 Yergin, Daniel. The Prize: The Epic Quest for Oil, Money, and Power (1991)

Historiography
 Ansari, K. Humayun. "The Muslim world in British historical imaginations: ‘re-thinking Orientalism’?." Orientalism Revisited (Routledge, 2012) pp. 29-58.
 Macfie, A.L. The Eastern Question 1774-1923 (2nd ed. Routledge, 2014).
 Tusan, Michelle. “Britain and the Middle East: New Historical Perspectives on the Eastern Question.” History Compass 8#3 (2010): 212–222.

Primary sources
 Anderson, M.S. ed. The great powers and the Near East, 1774-1923 (Edward Arnold, 1970).
 Bourne, Kenneth, ed. The Foreign Policy of Victorian England 1830-1902 (1970); 147 primary documents, plus 194 page introduction. online free to borrow
 Fraser, T. G. ed. The Middle East, 1914-1979 (1980) 102 primary sources; focus on Palestine/Israel
 Hurewitz, J. C. ed. The Middle East and North Africa in world politics: A documentary record vol 1: European expansion: 1535-1914 (1975); vol 2: A Documentary Record 1914-1956 (1956)vol 2 online

External links
 The Middle East : peace and the changing order from the Dean Peter Krogh Foreign Affairs Digital Archives

Historiography of the British Empire
History of the foreign relations of the United Kingdom
United Kingdom foreign policy
Imperialism
Diplomacy during the Greek War of Independence
Foreign relations of the United Kingdom
History of the Middle East
History of the Ottoman Empire
Historiography of the Ottoman Empire
19th-century military history of the United Kingdom
Ottoman Empire–United Kingdom relations
History of the Balkans